Jaya Engineering College is an educational institute located in Thiruninravur, Tamil Nadu, India. The college is  ISO 9001:2000 certified and affiliated to Anna University, Chennai.

It is situated 7 km west of Avadi, 25 km from Chennai Central station and 22 km from Tiruvallur. It is approximately 1.5 km from Nemilichery Railway Station.

History

Founded in 1995, Jaya Engineering College is a part of the Jaya Group of Colleges.

Courses offered
Under Graduate
 B.E. Aeronautical Engineering
 B.E. Civil Engineering
 B.E. Computer Science and Engineering
 B.E. Electrical and Electronics Engineering
 B.E. Electronics and Communication Engineering
 B.E. Electronics And Instrumentation Engineering
 B.E. Mechanical Engineering
 B.Tech.Information Technology
 B.Tech. Textile Technology

Post Graduate
 M.E. Applied Electronics
 M.E. Computer Science and Engineering
 M.Tech. Textile Technology
 M.C.A  Computer Application

References

External links

 Official Website
 

Engineering colleges in Tamil Nadu
Colleges affiliated to Anna University
Educational institutions established in 1995
1995 establishments in Tamil Nadu